This is a list of NIT champions and semifinal appearances by school.  Schools whose names are italicized are no longer in Division I, and can no longer be included in the tournament.

Total NIT championships

Total NIT semifinal appearances

Most NIT appearances without a semifinal appearance

See also
NIT bids by school
NIT all-time team records

College men's basketball records and statistics in the United States